Karmacode is the fourth studio album by Italian gothic metal band Lacuna Coil, released on 31 March 2006 in several countries in Europe, 3 April in the UK and other European countries, 4 April in North America, and 5 April in several other European countries through Century Media Records. 500,000 copies of Karmacode have officially been sold worldwide.
In Italy the album sold over 20,000 copies, earning the album a Silver record. In the United States, the album sold around 200,000 copies.

The album's four singles released include "Our Truth", the Depeche Mode cover of "Enjoy the Silence", "Closer", and "Within Me".  Vocalist Cristina Scabbia confirmed that the song "Without Fear" is an Italian song.  Music videos for all singles have been released.

Karmacode has a more prominent Middle-Eastern sound compared with Lacuna Coil's previous releases.  The album is considered a blend of classical and modern rock, which is notably heavier and more metallic than previous releases.  Popmatters comments that the album "doesn’t take any bold steps forward, but it still shows just how good Lacuna Coil are at what they do, presented in a high-gloss, primed-for-stardom package that is bound to go over huge".

Two songs from the album have been featured in music video games: "Closer" in Guitar Hero III: Legends of Rock and as downloadable content in Rock Band, also on-disc featured in Rock Band Metal Track Pack, and "Our Truth" in Rock Band 2, Rock Band Unplugged and Guitar Hero World Tour.

In September 2007, Lacuna Coil and website digitalmusician.net launched a competition titled To the Edge remix, accepting remixes of song "To the Edge", with the possibility of a release.

Track list
All songs written by Lacuna Coil, except "Enjoy the Silence" written by Martin Gore

Enhanced CD content

 On the Road Movie -9:58 
 Our Truth (Video)

Release history

Charts

References

External links
 

Lacuna Coil albums
Century Media Records albums
2006 albums
Albums produced by Waldemar Sorychta